Brocksburg is an unincorporated community in Keya Paha County, Nebraska, United States.

History
Brocksburg was laid out by Henry Brockman and named for him. A post office was established at Brocksburg in 1899, and remained in operation until it was discontinued in 1957.

References

External links

Unincorporated communities in Keya Paha County, Nebraska
Unincorporated communities in Nebraska